Lophopleuropsis is a genus of snout moths. It was described by Hans Georg Amsel in 1956, and contains the species Lophopleuropsis flavostrialis. It is found in Venezuela.

References

Moths described in 1956
Chrysauginae
Pyralidae genera
Monotypic moth genera
Taxa named by Hans Georg Amsel